Tengiz Tsikaridze (born 21 December 1995) is a Georgian football player for Zhetysu.

Club career
Tsikaridze made his debut in the Russian Football National League for FC Tom Tomsk on 27 February 2021 in a game against FC Alania Vladikavkaz.

On 30 July 2021, Tsikaridze signed for Kazakhstan Premier League club Zhetysu.

Honours
Torpedo Kutaisi
 Georgian Cup: 2018
 Georgian Super Cup: 2018, 2019

Dila Gori
 Erovnuli Liga: 2014–15

References

External links
 
 Profile by Russian Football National League

1995 births
People from Gori, Georgia
Living people
Footballers from Georgia (country)
Association football midfielders
FC Dila Gori players
FC Shukura Kobuleti players
FC Torpedo Kutaisi players
FC Chikhura Sachkhere players
FC Tom Tomsk players
FC Zhetysu players
Erovnuli Liga players
Russian First League players
Expatriate footballers from Georgia (country)
Expatriate footballers in Russia
Expatriate footballers in Kazakhstan